Juan Carlos Contreras Uribe (born January 16, 1975), better known under the ring name Apocalipsis, is a Mexican luchador enmascarado, or masked professional wrestler currently working for the Mexican professional wrestling promotion Consejo Mundial de Lucha Libre (CMLL) portraying a rudo ("Bad guy") wrestling character. He previously worked under the ring name El Koreano.

Professional wrestling career
Juan Contreras made his in-ring debut on February 11, 2000, after training under Consejo Mundial de Lucha Libre (CMLL) wrestling trainers Tony Salazar and Jose Luis Feliciano. He adopted the ring name El Koreano for his wrestling character, a martial arts inspired character that supposedly was from South Korea. Early in his career as El Koreano, Contreras worked a storyline feud against Ricky Marvin, a storyline that resulted in the two fighting each other under Lucha de Apuestas, or "bet match", rule where each participant would be either their wrestling mask or hair on the outcome of the match. Marvin won, which meant that the unmasked Koerano was forced to have all his hair shaved off in front of the audience in attendance. In 2004 CMLL created the Guapos University ("Hansome University"), or Guapos U, a storyline similar to various reality show contests such as the WWE Tough Enough show, searching for a new member to join Shocker, Máscara Mágica and El Terrible as part of Los Guapos. The contestants included El Koreano in addition to Sangre Azteca,  Alan Stone, Chris Stone, El Texano Jr., Misterioso Jr., Brazo de Oro Jr., Brazo de Plata Jr., Fabian El Gitano, Tigre Metálico, Lestat, Leono, Lobo Vikingo, Máximo, Karissma, Espiritu Maligno and Sangre Azteca. The group would participate in a series of matches as Los Guapos tried to determine a winner worthy of joining their ranks. The matches included a tournament for Guapos U  contestants only, where the winning team would get the Mexican National Trios Championship. The tournament was won by Misterioso Jr., Brazo de Oro Jr. and El Texano Jr. although they were unable to win the Championship when they received their championship match. During one of CMLL's shows El Terrible turned on the group and was joined by Último Guerrero in the attack on the rest of  Los Guapos. El Koreano and fellow Guapo U member Sangre Azteca prevented the rest of the group from stopping the attack, leading to the two them being kicked out of the group. Guerrero immediately took both El Koreano and Sangre Azteca under his wing, forming Pandilla Guerrera ("Gang of Warriors"), a mid-card group associated with Último Guerrero's Los Guerreros del Infierno group. Sangre Azteca soon became the leader of the group that besides El Koreano also included Ramstein, Hooligan, Nitro, Arkangel de la Muerte, Loco Max and Doctor X. In June 2005 Contreras wrestled his last match under the "El Koreano" name.

Apocalipsis (2005–present)
A month later Contreras made his debut as the enmascarado ("masked wrestler") character "Apocalipsis" (Spanish for "Apocalypse"), a character not associated with Pandilla Guerrera at all, with CMLL not publicly acknowledging that it was Contreras under the mask. He made his Apocalisis debut as part of the 2005 Gran Alternativa tournament, where a Novato or rookie, teamed up with a veteran for a tag team tournament. As Apocalipsis he teamed up with Damian 666 for the tournament. The tournament was held on July 1, 2005, and featured a Battle Royal between the eight rookies to determine the seeding for the tournament. Doctor X won the battle royal to earn the top seed for Universo 2000 and himself. Order of elimination in the battle royal was: #1 El Texano Jr., #2 Nitro, #3 Apokalipsis, #4 Máximo, #5 Sangre Azteca, #6 La Máscara, #7 Misterioso Jr. The team lost to eventual tournament winners La Máscara and Atlantis in the first round of the tournament. A few weeks later, on July 29, 2005, Apocalipsis was one of 8 wrestlers in a torneo cibernetico elimination match that was part of CMLL's G1 Junior Climax tournament. Apocalipsis was eliminated early in as La Máscara won the match. In the years following his character change Contreras, as Apocalipsis, worked primarily in the first and second match of the night, often playing the villainous foil to young tecnico wrestlers. In 2008 he suffered a severe shoulder injury when Metálico dove out of the ring onto Apocalipsis. The injury kept him out of the ring for a long period of time, but upon his return, he resumed his role as an opening match rudo. In 2011 Apocalipsis was one of the "veteran" rudos who were matched up against a group of young CMLL wrestlers called Generacion 2011. Apocalipsis joined up with Inquisidor, Los Rayos Tapatío and a number of other low or mid-card Rudos to fight Generacion 2011 representatives Dragon Lee, Magnus, Hombre Bala Jr. and Super Halcón Jr. Originally the focus of the storyline was on the conflicts between Los Rayos and Dragon Lee, playing off Los Rayos feeling that Dragon Lee was an arrogant rookie who had not "paid his due", but when Dragon Lee was injured plans had to be changed. After playing a supporting character in the "Veterans vs. Generacion 2011" storyline Apocalipsis continued to work as a low-card rudo worker whose primary purpose is to help rookie tecnicos gain in-ring experience.

Luchas de Apuestas record

References

1975 births
21st-century professional wrestlers
Mexican male professional wrestlers
Living people
Masked wrestlers
Professional wrestlers from Mexico City